The Darkinyung are an indigenous Australian people of New South Wales.

Country
According to R. H. Mathews, the Darkinyung's territory encompassed the lands to the south of the Hunter River, from Jerry's Plains towards Maitland, extending as far to the south as Wollombi Brook, Putty Creek, inclusive of the Macdonald, Colo, and Hawkesbury rivers.

History of contact with white settlers
In 1789, Governor Arthur Phillip conducted a boat expedition upstream to the branches of the Hawkesbury River, encountering the local inhabitants.  He returned overland in 1791; members of his party who were natives of the Cumberland Plain confirmed that the people there were of a distinct group that spoke a different language. Phillip wrote: "Two of those natives who have lived amongst us for some time were with us, which was from them that we understood, our new friends had a language different from theirs." The British referred to these inhabitants of the upper Hawkesbury, Richmond Hill, Kurrajong and Springwood as "The Branch natives".

Ford writes that, after settlement of the upper Hawkesbury, "'The Branch' natives were pacified in 1805 by a massacre led by Andrew Thompson towards Springwood."

In 1824, John Blaxland, Jnr,  learned that the mountain people south of the Hunter River referred to their land as Wallambine.  Later, Surveyor-General Thomas Mitchell instructed that a new town in the region be named Wollombi.  The term "Wollombi Tribe" came to be used for that group.

By the last years of the 19th century, only a remnant, mostly half-castes, of 60 Darkinyung had survived, concentrated on a government reserve set aside for aborigines on the Hawkesbury river,  from Windsor. Of these, only two very old men had been initiated, Hoe Gooburra and Charley Clark. It was thanks to these elderly informants that much of what is known of Darkinung traditional ways was able to be recorded by Mathews.

Bora ceremony

Name
The name has been variously spelled Darkinyung (AIATSIS), Darkinjung (Tindale), Darkiñung (Ford), Darkinung, Darkin-yûng, Darkinyoong, Darkinjang, etc.

Notes

Citations

Sources

 5pp.

Aboriginal peoples of New South Wales